Kerans is a surname. Notable people with the surname include: 

 Frederick Kerans (1849–1894), British barrister and politician
 Grattan Kerans (1941–2019), American politician
 John Kerans (1915–1985), British Royal Navy officer and politician
 Lori Kerans (born 1963), American basketball coach
 Sally Kerans (born 1960), American politician